Peter Valier (born 27 July 1992) is a French ice hockey player for Brûleurs de Loups and the French national team.

He represented France at the 2019 IIHF World Championship.

References

External links

1992 births
Living people
Boxers de Bordeaux players
Brûleurs de Loups players
Dauphins d'Épinal players
Dragons de Rouen players
Ducs de Dijon players
French ice hockey forwards
Sportspeople from Pontoise